The 1975 Uganda National League was the eighth season of the Ugandan football championship, the top-level football league of Uganda.

Overview
The 1975 Uganda National League was contested by 10 teams and was won by Express FC.

League standings

Leading goalscorer
The top goalscorer in the 1975 season was Chris Ddungu of Kampala City Council FC with 12 goals.

References

External links
 Uganda - List of Champions - RSSSF (Hans Schöggl)
 Ugandan Football League Tables - League321.com

Ugandan Super League seasons
Uganda
Uganda
Football